Charles Michael Maloney  (May 22, 1886 – January 17, 1967), was a professional baseball player who pitched in the Major Leagues for the Boston Doves. He went to college at Boston College.

External links

1886 births
1967 deaths
Major League Baseball pitchers
Baseball players from Massachusetts
Boston Doves players